PLEO is an animatronic pet dinosaur toy manufactured by Innvo Labs, a company located in Hong Kong and Nevada. The toy has the appearance and (imagined) behavior of a week-old baby Camarasaurus dinosaur. It was designed by Caleb Chung, the co-creator of the Furby, Chung's company Ugobe first sold Pleo and was manufactured by Jetta Company Limited. The species of dinosaur chosen allows for concealing the sensors and motors needed for the animation, since it has a big body shape and relatively large head. According to their website, each Pleo would "learn" from its experiences and environment through artificial intelligence and develop an individual personality.

PLEO was unveiled on February 7, 2006, at the DEMO Conference in Scottsdale, Arizona, and was expected to come on the Indian and American markets around Fall 2007. PLEO shipments started on December 5, 2007.

In April 2009, Ugobe laid off all of its employees and filed for bankruptcy.

On June 8, 2009, the original PLEO manufacturer Jetta announced it is re-launching Pleo and are continuing the line including accessories such as the vital battery and battery charger components. Since 14 July 2009, PLEO is owned by Innvo Labs Corporations (a division of Jetta).

In December 2011, the second generation, PLEO rb, was first launched in America, Europe and Hong Kong where Innvo Labs headquarters are located.

On July 10, 2017, the NPR "Hidden Brain" interviewer Shankar Vedantam used a Pleo robot on the stage of the "Aspen Ideas Festival" to illustrate some issues of "robot ethics" while interviewing Kate Darling of MIT's Media Lab.

Features 

 Camera-based vision system (for light detection and navigation)
 Two microphones, binaural hearing
 Beat detection (allows Pleo to dance and listen to music).
 Touch sensors (head, chin, shoulders, back, feet) (12 in total)
 Four ground foot sensors (surface detection)
 Fourteen force-feedback sensors, one per joint
 Orientation tilt sensor for body position
 Infrared mouth sensor for object detection into mouth
 Two-way infrared communication with other Pleos
 Infrared detection for external objects
 32-bit Atmel ARM7 microprocessor (main processor for Pleo)
 32-bit NXP Semiconductors ARM7 sub-processor (camera system, dedicated audio input processor)
 Four 8-bit processors (low-level motor control)

Ugobe bankruptcy 

Beginning in December 2008, Pleoworld.com began to experience technical problems. By the Christmas holidays, Pleoworld was offline, including the user forums. After the holidays, both Pleoworld and Ugobe's official websites displayed updating website messages. Both sites returned sometime at the beginning of 2009, and Ugobe's official website updated its board of directors listing. Ugobe stated that the problems were due to the company's relocation but had not explained why the user forums had not been restored.

Wired News reported the company's outlook was not good, and it struggled to save itself from extinction as it tried to raise new funding and keep its pipeline of products alive.

From November 2008, the company saw a host of top management departures, including two CEOs. It also moved its office to California, paring down its marketing and Public Relations staff to weather the current economic storm. (This may be the reason for Pleoworld's demise.) Emails to the company's media contact on its website bounced back, and phone calls to its corporate office were not answered.

In July 2008, Ugobe CEO Bob Christopher stepped down, and former CFO Liz Gasper retook control of the company. Christopher said he left the company to move on to other ventures. Gasper had focused on cutting down the company's burn rate and finding new funding.

With the collapse of the United States credit environment, though, fundraising came to a halt. Meanwhile, the company's entire board of directors resigned before December 2008, giving control of Ugobe back to the co-founders.

Ugobe also closed its Emeryville, California, office and moved all operations to its new offices in Boise, Idaho. The company then had about twenty employees.

It had become extremely difficult for new PLEOs owners or existing members of the website to access the official forums and Plogs. In the wake of these problems, a loyal fan has set up a forum for members to join to talk about Pleo, get the latest Pleo news, and download firmware updates for Pleo.

On April 17, 2009, Ugobe filed for chapter 7 bankruptcy and halted the production of new PLEOs.

Jetta acquired PLEO

On June 8, 2009, Jetta acquired PLEO and later in July, Innvo Labs was founded for the development of PLEO business while Jetta continued to manufacture for the PLEO line. Innvo Labs is a division of Jetta and is a privately held company based in Hong Kong. Jetta and Innvo Labs is committed to re-launch the PLEO line and continue the line of products including accessories such as the recovery battery and charger components for Ugobe PLEO.
In order to strengthen its brand, Innvo Labs is decided to enhance their customer service, and so set up a customer service hotline and email to collect public opinions and reply to customer inquiries on PLEO and PLEO rb.

PLEO rb

In December 2011, the latest iteration, the PLEO rb (Standing for ReBorn), was invented and released.
PLEO rb is similar to the original PLEO. However, no two units are exactly alike: each PLEO rb comes with randomly selected eyeball, eyelid and eye-shadow colours. The skin is always a slightly different hue of green. A special line of pink or blue PLEO rb were released in late 2012.
PLEO rb has more senses than the original. The enhancements include:
Eyes: It can now recognise colors and patterns; it can also detect drop-offs so it steps back from the risk of falling.
Ears: It can hear, and will turn towards the source. Owners can name it and teach it verbal commands using "learning stones".
Nose and mouth: It can sense what kind of "food" or "medicine" owners are feeding and then it will choose to eat or not according to its simulated needs and wants.
Skin: It can sense the temperature of its surroundings and react accordingly; it can sense whether it is being petted or hit and react to touch.
Time: It can recognize the time to wake up, eat and sleep.
There are altogether 9 new kinds of food and medicine items made for PLEO rb in different health and life situations and 7 new "learning stones": these can teach PLEO rb how to bow, dance, sign, walk towards their owner, play games, etc.

PLEO rb is designed to behave like a life-form, with 4 distinct life stages. When unboxed, it behaves like a newborn and needs to be "hatched" and brought up. With proper care, it will "grow up" into a juvenile after about two days. It starts to stand and walk smoothly during its teenage stage, and can then be taught to recognize its name. As owners continue to teach verbal commands, it will get to the mature stage and all features will be fully enabled.

References

External links

Official PLEOWorld Website for PLEO rb
Official PLEOWorld Website for PLEO

Products and services discontinued in 2009
Entertainment robots
Robotic dinosaurs
Toy brands
2007 robots
Robots of the United States
Animatronic robots